Mike Nichols was an American comedian, director, producer, and actor of the stage and screen. He began his career in the 1950s as a comedian alongside Elaine May doing improvisational comedy. Together they formed the comedy duo Nichols and May. Their live improv act was a hit sensation on Broadway, and the first of their three albums won a Grammy Award for Best Comedy Album in 1962. Nichols also became known as a director of plays on the Broadway stage including Neil Simon's Barefoot in the Park (1963), The Odd Couple (1965), and Plaza Suite (1968). He also directed acclaimed revival productions of Anton Chekov's The Seagull (2002), Arthur Miller's Death of a Salesman (2012) and Harold Pinter's Betrayal (2013).

Nichols was also known as a film director breaking out with Who's Afraid of Virginia Woolf? (1966) starring Elizabeth Taylor and Richard Burton, and The Graduate (1967) starring Dustin Hoffman and Anne Bancroft. Nichols continued directing acclaimed films such as the war film Catch-22 (1970), the sexual coming of age drama Carnal Knowledge (1971), the drama Silkwood (1983), the romantic comedy Working Girl (1988), the farce comedy The Birdcage (1996), the political drama Primary Colors (1998), the romantic drama Closer (2004), and biographical drama Charlie Wilson's War (2007). Nichols also became known for his work on television directing HBO adaptations of Margaret Edson's Wit (2001) and Tony Kushner's Angels in America (2003) starring Meryl Streep and Al Pacino.

Theatre

Film 

Executive producer
 The Longshot (1986)
 Friends with Kids (2011)
 Crescendo! The Power of Music (2014) (Documentary)

Performer
 The Designated Mourner (1997) as Jack

Television

Discography
Improvisations to Music (1958) Mercury 
An Evening with Mike Nichols and Elaine May (1960) Mercury 
Mike Nichols & Elaine May Examine Doctors (1961) Mercury MG 20680/SR 60680 
In Retrospect (1962) Polygram, compilation, re-released as compact disc in 1996

References

External links
 - American Film Institute
2010 Life Achievement Award - American Film Institute
The Evolution of Mike Nichols, New York article

American filmographies
Male actor filmographies